Theodor Bergmann (born 8 November 1996) is a German former professional footballer who played as a midfielder.

Career
In 2020, Bergmann joined Regionalliga Nordost club Carl Zeiss Jena from 3. Liga  side 1. FC Kaiserslautern. He signed a one-year contract with the option of a second.

References

Living people
1996 births
German footballers
Association football midfielders
FC Rot-Weiß Erfurt players
1. FC Kaiserslautern players
FC Carl Zeiss Jena players
Berliner FC Dynamo players
3. Liga players
Regionalliga players
People from Bad Langensalza
Footballers from Thuringia